The 1923 Cornell Big Red football team was an American football team that represented Cornell University as an independent during the 1923 college football season. The team finished with an 8–0 record, shut out five of eight opponents, and outscored all opponents by a total of 339 to 27. The 1923 season was part of 26-game winning streak that began in October 1921 and ended in October 1924 and included national championship claims for 1921, 1922, and 1923.

There was no contemporaneous system in 1923 for determining a national champion. However, Cornell was retroactively named as the national champion by Jeff Sagarin in 1978. Illinois, Michigan, and Yale were selected as the 1923 national champion or co-champion by other selectors.

Cornell quarterback George Pfann was a consensus first-team player on the 1923 All-America college football team. Tackle Frank Sundstrom also received first-team All-America honors from Walter Camp, Lawrence Perry, and Percy Haughton.

Schedule

References

Cornell
Cornell Big Red football seasons
College football national champions
College football undefeated seasons
Cornell Big Red football